A statue of William Shakespeare, by the sculptor Giovanni Fontana after an original by Peter Scheemakers, has formed the centrepiece of Leicester Square Gardens in London since 1874.

Description and history
The marble figure, copied from Scheemakers's 18th-century monument to Shakespeare in Poets' Corner, Westminster Abbey, stands on a pedestal flanked by dolphins at the centre of a fountain. It is the result of improvements to the gardens made by the financier Albert Grant, who bought the Square in 1874 and had it refurbished to a design by James Knowles.

The scroll held by Shakespeare is inscribed with a quotation from Twelfth Night (Act IV, Scene II), where the original in Poets' Corner has a misquoted passage from The Tempest. The Leicester Square statue also differs from its model in omitting portrait reliefs of Henry V, Richard III and Elizabeth I from the plinth on which Shakespeare rests. The inscription on the pedestal in Leicester Square reads:

The statue is listed at Grade II. In 2012 it underwent restoration, and the cleaning was completed – by Tom Brown of London Stone Carving Limited – and new water features added in 2014.

References

Bibliography

External links

 
 Shakespeare statue returned to Leicester Square by Jaymi McCann (17 October 2012), London Evening Standard
 Bard restored to Leicester Square by Matthew Amer, Official London Theatre (2013)

19th-century sculptures
Shakespeare, William
Leicester Square
Marble sculptures in the United Kingdom
Memorials to William Shakespeare
Monuments and memorials in London
Outdoor sculptures in London
Shakespeare, William
Shakespeare
Dolphins in art